Hirayama is a Japanese surname. Notable people with the surname include:

, Japanese actress
, Japanese film director 
, Japanese painter
, who discovered the Hirayama families of asteroids
, Japanese sport wrestler
, Japanese politician
 Lalla Hirayama, South African television host, actress, dancer and model
 Nathan Hirayama, Canadian rugby player
, Japanese American baseball player
, first Japanese astronomer to discover an asteroid
, an international football (soccer) player
, Japanese football player
, Japanese badminton player
, Japanese rock climber

See also
 1999 Hirayama, an asteroid
 Hirayama (crater), lunar crater
 Hirayama family, a family of asteroids
 Hirayama Station, a train station in Chiba Prefecture
 Hirayama syndrome, a lower motor neuron disease

Japanese-language surnames